Bajie Subdistrict is a subdistrict situated in southern Anning City, Yunnan province, southwestern China. It lies about 38 km west of Anning City, situated on the west bank of the Mingyi River. Formerly a town, its status changed to a subdistrict of Anning in 2011.

References

Anning, Yunnan
Township-level divisions of Kunming